The Kerrang! Award for Best Single is an honor presented at the Kerrang! Awards, an annual ceremony established in 1993 to recognise achievements in rock music. The award was renamed 'Best Song' for the 2018 ceremony onwards, but serves the same purpose. Like all Kerrang! Awards, the trophy awarded to the winning act is shaped in the style of the 'K' from the Kerrang! logo.

Achievements

Thirty Seconds to Mars holds the record for most wins at three ("The Kill", "From Yesterday", "Hurricane"). The band was also the first artist to win Best Single in two consecutive years for the years 2007 ("The Kill") and 2008 ("From Yesterday") and have successfully won the award each time they have been nominated.

As of 2019, Slipknot hold the record for most nominations with a total of five, including two nominations in the same year at the 2009 Kerrang! Awards.

Recipients

See also
List of Kerrang! Award winners

References

External links
 

Best Single
Song awards
Songwriting awards
Awards established in 1999